The Australian Voice Party was registered by the Australian Electoral Commission on 2 July 2013, and deregistered on 23 July 2015 when membership fell below the 500 required by the Australian Electoral Commission.

Candidates for 2013 Federal Election
The party had endorsed Senate candidates in the 2013 Federal Election for the following states: New South Wales, Victoria , Queensland (2) and Western Australia.  The party also contested the re-run Western Australian Senate election on 5 April 2014.

Following the 2013 Federal election, the party adopted a new, more democratic constitution and elected a new leadership team led by then President Jamie Cavanough (New South Wales) and National Secretary Bevan Collingwood (Queensland).  All policies were also reviewed and updated on the party website.  The Party re-launched in April 2018.

External links
Party website

References

Defunct political parties in Australia